The 1941–42 Copa México Copa México, was the 26th staging of this Mexican football cup competition that existed from 1907 to 1997.

The competition started on May 31, 1942, and concluded on September 20, 1942, with the Final, held at the Parque Asturias in México DF
, in which Atlante F.C. lifted the trophy for first time.

For this edition the team which lose 2 matches is eliminated

First round

Second play off

Seleccion Jalisco Eliminated

Moctezuma Eliminated

Necaxa only undefeated team, bye to final

Asturias eliminated

Play Off

América Eliminated

Club España Eliminated

Marte Eliminated

Final

First leg

Second leg

Atlante Won the cup aggregate 10-3

References
Mexico - Statistics of Copa México in season 1941/1942. (RSSSF)

Copa Mexico, 1941-42
Copa MX
Copa